Malaysia competed at the 1996 Summer Olympics in Atlanta, United States.

Medal summary

Medals by sport

Medallists

Athletics

Men
Track event

Field event

Women
Road event

Badminton

Boxing

Men

Canoeing

Slalom

Field hockey

Men's tournament

Team roster

 Mohamed Nasihin Nubil Ibrahim
 Maninderjit Singh Magmar
 Lailin Abu Hassan
 Brian Jaya Siva
 Lim Chiow Chuan
 Charles David
 Chairil Anwar Abdul Aziz
 Lam Mun Fatt
 Shankar Ramu
 Nor Saiful Zaini Nasiruddin
 Kaliswaran Muniandy
 Aphthar Singh Piara
 Mirnawan Nawawi
 Calvin Fernandez
 Kuhan Shanmuganathan
 Hamdan Hamzah

Group B

 Qualified for semifinals

Ninth to twelfth place classification

Eleventh to twelfth place match

Ranked 11th in final standings

Sailing

Open

Shooting

Men

Swimming

Men

Women

References

 Official Olympic Reports
 International Olympic Committee results database

Nations at the 1996 Summer Olympics
1996
Summer Olympics